The Canada 1921 census was a detailed enumeration of the Canadian population. The census count was taken as at 1 June 1921. The total population count was 8,788,483 representing a 22% increase over the 1911 census population count of 7,206,643. The 1921 census was the sixth comprehensive decennial census since Canadian Confederation on 1 July 1867. The previous census was the Northwest Provinces of Alberta, Saskatchewan, and Manitoba 1916 census and the following census was the Northwest Provinces of Alberta, Saskatchewan, and Manitoba 1926 census.

Census summary
Information was collected on the following five subjects, with separate schedules or questionnaires for each subject: 
 Population
 Agriculture
 Animals, animal products, fruits not on farms
 Manufacturing and trading establishments
 Supplemental questionnaire for persons who were blind and deaf.

The five schedules contained a total of 565 questions. The population questionnaire contained 35 questions with those on insanity and fertility having been dropped and a new question recording the birthplaces of the father and mother of each individual.

Population by province 

The most significant population growth took place in the Prairie provinces of Manitoba, Saskatchewan and Alberta, where the population count increased by 47%.

Methodology
The census was conducted by the Dominion Bureau of Statistics formed in 1918 by the Statistics Act. Census fieldwork was carried out by 241 commissioners and 11,425 enumerators responsible for the corresponding numbers of census districts and subdistricts structured to correspond closely to federal electoral constituencies and polling subdivisions respectively. A special staff of up to 350 in Ottawa compiled the census results using mechanical tabulation methods. In 1955, the paper census schedules were destroyed after the population schedules were microfilmed.

Release date and format
In accordance with the Statistics Act, the 1921 census returns were in the custody of Statistics Canada and the records were closed until 92 years after the taking of the census. In 2013, the records were opened for public use and transferred to Library and Archives Canada (LAC). In early July 2013, a spokesperson for LAC advised that the data comprises 197,529 images, and "Once assembled and fully indexed, it will constitute the largest on-line record of Canadian genealogical information." On 8 August 2013, raw digital images of the population schedules were made available to browse for free with a geographic index of districts and sub-districts on the private Ancestry.ca website. Ancestry.ca transcribed and indexed the data to facilitate advanced searches by individual Ancestry.ca subscribers, and in person at LAC and subscribing libraries, from late in 2013. The census data was scheduled to be made available on the LAC website three years after being made available on the Ancestry.ca website. The fully indexed online census data was launched by Ancestry.ca on 29 October 2013. The data is free to search, subject to registration on the Ancestry.ca website. On 30 August 2017, the results of the 1921 were made available on the Library and Archives Canada website.

See also

Population of Canada by year
Demographics of Canada
Ethnic groups in Canada
History of immigration to Canada

References

External links
 
 
 
 
 
 
  Includes links to 1921 Population Census Schedule and 1921 Enumerator Instructions.
 
 

Census
Censuses in Canada
Canada